KB Tirana (women) is a basketball team that play in the Albanian A-1 League. It is the most successful club in the Albanian Basketball history, with 41 championship titles won.

History
On August 16, 1920, the patriot P. Nika altogether with gentlemen A. Erebara, P. Jakova, A. Hoxha, A. Koja, P. Berisha, A. Zajmi, H. Fortuzi, B. Pazari, L. Berisha, S. Frasheri, H. Alizoti, A. Gjitomi and V. Fekeci founded "Agimi Sports Association". In 1927 on the initiative of Mr S. Stermasi, Mr A. Erebara, Mr A. Zajmi and Mr A. Koja, "Agimi" changed its name to Sportklub Tirana (SK Tirana). PBC Tirana Basketball (women) are 41 times Champions of Albania, and also 26 times winners of the Cup, more than any other Albanian club. PBC Tirana have also taken part in some European competitions and in many friendly international tournaments, where occasionally have reached several successes, like winning against very strong opponents BC Levski Sofia in the 1st round of 1994-95 Champions Clubs Cup. PBC Tirana are a legendary club in female basketball of Albania, dominating this discipline throughout the course of the history.

Since 2003, KB Tirana are trying to compete in the highest levels of women's basketball and bid to return in their glorious winning years. They have only won one championship, however also have 4 domestic Cups and 3 Supercup trophies from 2003 to date.

Home Court: Asllan Rusi (3.000)

Domestic achievements
Albanian A-1 League Champions - 41 (1947, 1948, 1949, 1950, 1951, 1952, 1953, 1954, 1955, 1956, 1957, 1958, 1959, 1960, 1961, 1962, 1963, 1964, 1966, 1968, 1969, 1970, 1971, 1972, 1973, 1974, 1976,1982, 1983, 1986, 1987, 1988, 1991, 1992, 1993, 1994, 1995, 1997, 1998, 1999, 2019) (Record)

Albanian Basketball Cup Winners - 26 (1956, 1957, 1960, 1961, 1962, 1965, 1966, 1967, 1968, 1969, 1970, 1971, 1972, 1976, 1977, 1979, 1984, 1986, 1989, 1993, 1995, 1997, 2005, 2013, 2018, 2019) (Record)

Albanian Basketball Supercup Winners - 3 (2003, 2016, 2018)

Roster

PBC Tirana (men)
For the male basketball team see PBC Tirana

References

External links 
 Eurobasket.com Team Page
Women's basketball teams in Albania
Sport in Tirana
Basketball teams established in 1946